Guimer Justiniano Osorio (born 29 June 1989) is a Bolivian footballer who plays in central defence for Bolivian Primera División for Royal Pari F.C.

Career
Having initially played as a left-back he began to transition to centre-back in 2018 due to his aerial ability. He wore the captains armband for Royal Pari for the first time in October 2020 as the club started playing again after the enforced break from playing for the COVID-19 pandemic.

International career
He made his full debut for Bolivia on the 10 October 2019, against Venezuela. Further international call-ups to Bolivian squad came in 2020.

References

External links
 

Living people
Bolivian footballers
Bolivian Primera División players
Bolivia international footballers
Association football defenders
Guabirá players
Royal Pari F.C. players
Sportspeople from Santa Cruz de la Sierra
1989 births